Chromosome 17q12 duplication syndrome is a protein in humans that is encoded by the DUP17Q12 gene.

References 

Genes on human chromosome 17